The Scotland women's under-19 cricket team represents Scotland in international under-19 women's cricket. The team is administrated by Cricket Scotland (CS).

Scotland qualified for the inaugural ICC Under-19 Women's T20 World Cup via winning the Europe Qualifier, winning a three-match series against the Netherlands 3–0. They were eliminated in the first group stage at the tournament.

History
The inaugural Women's Under-19 World Cup was scheduled to take place in January 2021, but was postponed multiple times due to the COVID-19 pandemic. The tournament was eventually scheduled to take place in 2023, in South Africa. Scotland competed in the Europe Qualifier for the tournament in August 2022, which consisted of a three-match series against the Netherlands. They won all three of the matches to qualify for the 2023 Under-19 World Cup. 

Scotland announced their squad for the tournament on 12 December 2022, with Peter Ross announced as Head Coach of the side. At the tournament, they lost all three of their matches in the first group stage, although they did beat the United States in a subsequent play-off.

Recent call-ups
The table below lists all the players who have been selected in recent squads for Scotland under-19s. Currently, this only includes the squad for the 2023 ICC Under-19 Women's T20 World Cup.

Records
International match summary

As of 20 January 2023

Youth Women's Twenty20 record versus other nations

As of 20 January 2023

Under-19 World Cup record

References

Women's Under-19 cricket teams
C
Scotland in international cricket